Victor Lenard Shapiro (16 October 1924, Chicago – 1 March 2013, Riverside, California) was an American mathematician, specializing in trigonometric series and differential equations. He is known for his two theorems (published in 1957) on the uniqueness of multiple Fourier series.

Biography

From the University of Chicago, Shapiro received B.Sc. in 1947, M.Sc. in 1949, and Ph.D. in 1952, all in mathematics. His thesis advisor was Antoni Zygmund. Shapiro was from 1952 to 1960 a professor at Rutgers University and from 1960 to 1964 a professor at the University of Oregon with 3 sabbatical years (in 1953–1955 and 1958–1959) at the Institute for Advanced Study. He was a professor at the University of California, Riverside from 1964 to 2010, when he retired as professor emeritus. He was the author of several books and the author or coauthor of over 80 articles in refereed journals.

Shapiro was elected in 2003 a Fellow of the American Association for the Advancement of Science (AAAS) and in 2012 a Fellow of the American Mathematical Society (AMS). In November 1995 in Riverside, California, a conference was held in his honor.

Upon his death he was survived by his widow, 4 children, and 13 grandchildren.

Selected publications

Articles

Books

References

20th-century American mathematicians
21st-century American mathematicians
Mathematical analysts
University of Chicago alumni
University of California, Riverside faculty
1924 births
2013 deaths
Fellows of the American Association for the Advancement of Science
Fellows of the American Mathematical Society